KFF may refer to:

Kazakhstan Football Federation
King Faisal Foundation
Kaiser Family Foundation
Kalmar FF, a Swedish football club
Kenya Football Federation
Kung Fu Factory, a video-game developer
Kung Fu Films
Kaohsiung Film Festival